Charles Clarke may refer to:
Charles Clarke (born 1950), former British Member of Parliament.
Charles Clarke (judge) (died 1750), English barrister, judge and politician
Charles Clarke (numismatist) (1719–1780), English numismatist and antiquarian
Charles Clarke (Canadian politician) (1826–1909), speaker of the Legislative Assembly of Ontario, Canada
Charles Clarke (botanist), Australian botanist
Charles Clarke (RAF officer) (1923–2019), British RAF officer and Great Escape lookout 
Charles Baron Clarke (1832–1906), British botanist
Charles Clarke (antiquary) (died 1840), English antiquary
Charles E. Clarke (1790–1863), U.S. Representative from New York
Charles E. J. Clarke (1795–1844), English organist
Charles Goddard Clarke (1849–1908), Liberal Member of Parliament for Peckham, 1906–1908
Charles Kirk Clarke (1857–1924), Canadian psychiatrist
Sir Lawrence Clarke, 7th Baronet (Charles Lawrence Somerset Clarke, born 1990), English athlete
Charlie Clarke (Blue Heelers), fictional character in Australian program, Blue Heelers
Charlie Clarke (footballer) (1879–1946), Australian rules footballer
Charles Clarke (cricketer, born 1910) (1910–1997), English cricketer
Charles Clarke (cricketer, born 1878) (1878–?), Scottish cricketer
Charles Clarke (Surrey cricketer) (1853–1931), English cricketer
Charles Cowden Clarke (1787–1877), English author
Charles G. Clarke (1899–1983), American cinematographer
Charles Bailey Clarke (1875–1944), mayor of Portland, Maine, 1918–1921
Charles Clarke (priest) (1871–1947), Anglican priest and author
C. Allen Clarke (1863–1935), English novelist and journalist
Sir Charles Clarke, 2nd Baronet (1812–1899)
Sir Charles Clarke, 3rd Baronet (1839–1932), Quartermaster-General to the Forces
Charles Henry Douglas Clarke (died 1981), Canadian forester and zoologist

See also
Charles Clark (disambiguation)
Charles Clerke (disambiguation)